Siyari Rural Municipality (Nepali :सियारी गाउँपालिका) is a Gaunpalika in Rupandehi District in Lumbini Province of Nepal. On 12 March 2017, the government of Nepal implemented a new local administrative structure, with the implementation of the new local administrative structure, VDCs have been replaced with municipal and Village Councils. Siyari one of these 753 local units. There are 7 ward in siyari Gaunpalika which is combined former  chilhiya, mainahiya, harnaiya, dayanagar and west amawaa VDC.

References

Populated places in Rupandehi District
Rural municipalities of Nepal established in 2017